Green Montana is a Belgian rapper, born June 15, 1993 in Verviers. Active since 2015, he gained visibility when rapper Booba signed him to his label 92i Records in 2019. The artist has so far released 2 Albums and 3 EP's. He has various collaborations with rappers Booba, SDM, Koba LaD, Isha or OldPee of 13 Block group.

Discography

Albums 

 2020 - ALASKA
 2022 - NOSTALGIA+

EP's 

 2018 - Bleu Nuit
 2018 - Orange Métallique
 2021 - MELANCHOLIA 999

References

External links 

 Music resources: Discogs, MusicBrainz

Belgian rappers
Belgian singer-songwriters
1993 births
Living people